Surabhi Yaamangal is a 1986 Indian Malayalam film, directed by P. Ashok Kumar and produced by EVR Enterprises. The film stars Jagathy Sreekumar, Ratheesh, Sukumaran and Balan K. Nair in the lead roles. The film has musical score by Kannur Rajan.

Cast
Ratheesh as Murali
Sukumaran as Suresh
Ravikumar as Johnny
Balan K. Nair as Mathews
Jagathy Sreekumar as pimp
Seema as Sumithra
Ahalya 
Kuthiravattam Pappu as Pokker
Bhagyalakshmi
Prathapachandran as Thampi
Kaviyoor Ponnamma as Meenakshi
Santhakumari as Murali's mother
Bahadoor as Blind man in train
Ahalya as Sumathi

Soundtrack
The music was composed by Kannur Rajan and the lyrics were written by Pappanamkodu Lakshmanan.

References

External links
 

1986 films
1980s Malayalam-language films